Silverado is an unincorporated community in Silverado Canyon, which is located in the Santa Ana Mountains in eastern Orange County, California. Portions of the town sit on a former Mexican land grant Rancho Lomas de Santiago.  Silverado is located at the boundaries of Cleveland National Forest. The site is a California Historical Landmark, and is located near the village site of Puhú.

History
Silverado was founded in 1878. The area was mined for silver during the late 19th and early 20th centuries. Remnants of mining operations such as the Blue Light Mine are still scattered in the area. Timber was harvested for use by the railroad. Coal was mined  at the time in Carbondale.  Ancient sea life fossils can be found within the sandstone cliffs in the area. During Spanish rule, the canyon was visited by Spanish explorers and was known by the name Cañada de la Madera (Timber Canyon). The town in Spain by that name bears a remarkable resemblance to Silverado. (The name Silverado is a type of Spanglish indicating a place where silver is found; a parallel formation to El Dorado.) The area enjoyed a renaissance in popularity in the 1940s as a hot springs vacation retreat, during which time hotels and restaurants prospered. Many weekend cabins were also built at that time. Home to a number of artists and craftsmen, the town now consists of about 2,000 residents, a general store, a cafe, a public library, a church, two fire stations, a community center, and a post office. It hosts summer concerts, an annual Country Fair, and an Easter breakfast. A local landmark near Silverado is Cook's Corner, a bar popular with motorcyclists.

Torrential rains from Pacific storms in 1939, and again in 1969, washed away homes and devastated roads and bridges. The latter storm resulted in a number of flood related casualties. On October 26, 2007, the Orange County Fire Authority issued a mandatory evacuation of the area due to the Santiago Fire. In September 2014, a fire burned approximately  within the canyon. However, no structures were lost.

Today new homes and developments from nearby urban areas are encroaching on the canyons. The largest proposed projects are by the Irvine Company, which plans to build two developments stretching along Santiago Canyon Road from Jamboree Road past Irvine Lake.

Marker
Marker at the site reads:
Located in Canada de la Madera (Timber Canyon), Silverado was a mining boom town founded in 1878 when silver was discovered nearby. During the colorful life of the boom, 1878-1881, miners, flocking to the area, established a thriving community, served daily by stage from Los Angeles and Santa Ana. Erected by California State Park Commission. (Marker Number 202.)

See also
California Historical Landmarks in Orange County, California
Puhú (former village)

References

Further reading
 Lost Below - A True Life Mining Adventure
 The Nature Conservancy: Santa Ana Mountains
 Santa Ana Mountains Wild Heritage Project
 Naturalist For You
 Cleveland National Forest
 Santa Ana Mountains Natural History Association

Unincorporated communities in Orange County, California
Santa Ana Mountains
Populated places established in 1878
Unincorporated communities in California
California Historical Landmarks
1878 establishments in California